Noor Nuyten (born 1986)  is a Dutch artist who lives and works in Amsterdam and Brussels

Education 
Nuyten followed a postgraduate program at HISK in Ghent (BE) and studied at Malmö Art Academy (SE) and Art Academy Minerva Groningen (NL). In 2015 she was a guest resident at the Rijksakademie van beeldende kunsten in Amsterdam (NL).

Work 
Nuyten is known for her diverse artistic practice, and multimedia works providing new ways to engage in a critical but humorous relationship with rationally structured systems.
She took part in exhibitions and events  at a.o. Staedtische Gallery Wolfsburg,Airspace Gallery Manchester, Kunsthalle Münster, museumnacht at Ons' Lieve Heer op Solder, PASS initiated by Jan Hoet Junior and Jan Hoet, Moscow International Biennale, Art International Istanbul,  Gallery in Johannesburg, Unseen Amsterdam, Art Rotterdam, Upstream Gallery, The Institute 
She gives artist workshops at Stedelijk Museum Amsterdam.

References

External links 
 Upstream Gallery / Noor Nuyten
 Noor Nuyten
 Website KNAW/AvK Mingler.network

1986 births
Living people
Dutch artists